Auximobasis insularis is a moth in the family Blastobasidae. It was described by Lord Walsingham in 1897. It is found in the West Indies.

Taxonomy
The name insularis is preoccupied by Asychna insularis described by Thomas Vernon Wollaston in 1858.

References

Blastobasidae
Moths described in 1897